Voorschoterlaan is an underground subway station in the city of Rotterdam, located on the Rotterdam Metro lines A, B, and C. The station opened on 10 May 1982, the same date that the East-West Line (also formerly called the Caland line), of which it is a part, was opened.

The station is located to the east of the city center, in the borough of Kralingen-Crooswijk. Overground people can get on at RET-Rotterdam tram line 7.

!Previous!!!!Line!!!!Next

Rotterdam Metro stations
Railway stations opened in 1982
1982 establishments in the Netherlands
Railway stations in the Netherlands opened in the 20th century